Francesca Segal (born 1980) is a British author and journalist. She was raised in a Jewish community in north-west London where she still lives today. She is best known for her novel, The Innocents, which won several book awards. She is the daughter of American author, Erich Segal.

Career

Segal studied at St Hugh's College, Oxford before becoming an author and journalist. Her writing has been published in many places including The Guardian, American Vogue, British Vogue, The Observer, and the Financial Times.

Her first novel, The Innocents was published in 2012 and is based in a Jewish community, similar to the one in which she grew up in. It won several awards and was also longlisted for the 2013 Baileys Women's Prize for Fiction.

Segal's second novel, The Awkward Age was published in May 2017. Her third book, Mother Ship is a memoir released in June 2019. It follows Segal in the aftermath of the premature birth of her twin daughters and their time spent in hospital.

Awards

2012 - Costa Award for a first novel for The Innocents
2012 - National Jewish Book Award for The Innocents
2013 - Betty Trask Award for The Innocents
2013 - Sami Rohr Prize for Jewish Literature for The Innocents
2013 - Harold U. Ribalow Prize for The Innocents

References

1980 births
British Jewish writers
Writers from London
Living people
Alumni of St Hugh's College, Oxford